Nguyễn Hữu Tuấn (born 6 May 1992) is a Vietnamese professional footballer who plays as a centre-back for V.League 1 club Hoàng Anh Gia Lai.

Honours
Hồ Chí Minh City
V.League 1: Runner-up 2020
Vietnamese Super Cup: Runner-up 2020

References

External links
 

1992 births
Living people
Vietnamese footballers
People from Da Nang
Association football central defenders
Ho Chi Minh City FC players
Hoang Anh Gia Lai FC players
V.League 1 players